Marco Alberto Pereira Osório (born 7 September 1979), known simply as Marco Osório, is a Portuguese former footballer who played as a midfielder.

Notes

References

1979 births
Living people
Portuguese footballers
Association football midfielders
Liga Portugal 2 players
Segunda Divisão players
Liga I players
C.D. Olivais e Moscavide players
S.C. Espinho players
CS Pandurii Târgu Jiu players
CD Operário players
Imortal D.C. players
Eléctrico F.C. players
S.C. Praiense players
Portuguese expatriate footballers
Expatriate footballers in Romania
Portuguese expatriate sportspeople in Romania